Cherelle Khassal (born 9 January 1991) is an Irish international footballer who plays for Portsmouth of the English FA Women's National League. She made her debut for the Republic of Ireland women's national football team in May 2012.

Club career

As a youngster Khassal travelled from Cowes on the Isle of Wight to train with Portsmouth when she was attending Cowes High School. She was scouted by Arsenal and joined The Gunners on a four-year academy contract in 2006. During the spring of 2010 Khassal was attached to Irish club Benfica. After moving to attend Capilano University, she played in the North American USL W-League with Santa Clarita Blue Heat and Los Angeles Strikers. She was nominated for W-League Rookie of the Season in 2010. 

She then moved back to Ireland and made a favorable impact at Wexford Youths during the 2011–12 Women's National League season. She went on to clubs Brighton and Hove Albion, Portsmouth and Lewes. Khassal then joined up with Chichester Ladies in the summer of 2016. 

After a successful first season with Chichester, they gained promotion for the first time in their history to the Womens Premier (South). Cherelle formed a deadly partnership with Charlie Wilson-Blakley and between them 30 goals were scored.

Her second season also saw a very good goals return of 18 in all competitions despite injury's plaguing her for most of the year. The team achieved a solid mid-table finish despite being tipped to go back down. A successful FA cup run saw 'Chi' reach the Quarter final stages against Liverpool. The game was played at Oakland's park (Chichester) and saw a record attendance of just over 600 people. The Reds ran out 3-0 winners on the day but Chichester showed a lot of courage and could have gone 1-0 within the first few minutes.

Return to Portsmouth

On 21 July 2021, Khassal signed for Portsmouth.
Khassal finished the season with 27 goals in 31 appearances in all competitions, including 15 goals in 20 appearances in the league.

International career

Khassal played for the Republic of Ireland Under-19 team in their 2010 UEFA Women's U-19 Championship Second qualifying round mini-tournament in Sweden.

In May 2012 national coach Susan Ronan gave Khassal a debut senior cap in a 1–0 friendly defeat by Switzerland at Stadion Niedermatten. She also appeared in Ireland's next match, a 1–0 UEFA Women's Euro 2013 qualifying defeat by Wales in Cork.

Khassal has been tipped to gain another senior call up for the European Qualifying Group stages but this has yet to materialise.

References

External links

Cherelle Khassal at Football Association of Ireland (FAI)
Cherelle Khassal at Lewes FC

1991 births
Living people
Republic of Ireland women's association footballers
Republic of Ireland women's international footballers
Arsenal W.F.C. players
Women's National League (Ireland) players
Expatriate women's soccer players in the United States
Expatriate women's soccer players in Canada
USL W-League (1995–2015) players
Brighton & Hove Albion W.F.C. players
Wexford Youths W.F.C. players
Lewes F.C. Women players
Women's association football wingers
Women's association football forwards
Benfica W.S.C. players
Republic of Ireland women's youth international footballers
Los Angeles Strikers players
Irish expatriate sportspeople in the United States